Italy competed at the 2009 World Championships in Athletics, held from August 15 to August 23. On August 3, the Italian national athletics federation (FIDAL) revealed the final team composed of 40 athletes (24 men and 16 women), but on 8 August, after a last test competition in Grosseto, Andrew Howe, in accordance with FIDAL, decided not to compete in Berlin. Just before publishing the team, Faloci, a discus thrower, also decided not to compete.

Italy did not win a single medal in the championships, the first time ever in the history of the World Athletics Championships that Italy have failed to win a medal, the first time since Melbourne 1956 in any major championships (World, Olympics or European), but the medals of some of the athletics world championship races in 2009 were otherwise awarded 24 March 2016 as a result of doping disqualifications. Among these reallocations also the medals of 20 km walk, which saw the Italian Giorgio Rubino, initially 4th, get the bronze medal This fact, 7 years after the event, allowed Italy to clear the zero in the Medal table. On 6 February 2018 IAAF disqualified Anna Chicherova for doping, 2nd in the high jump, so also Antonietta Di Martino was advanced to bronze medal.

Medalists

Finalists
Italy national athletics team ranked 17th (with 9 finalists) in the IAAF placing table. Rank obtained by assigning eight points in the first place and so on to the eight finalists.

Results
For the Italian national team participated at the events 35 athletes, 20 men and 15 women.

Men (20)
Track events

Field events

Women (15)
Track events

Field and combined events

References

External links
Official competition website

Nations at the 2009 World Championships in Athletics
World Championships in Athletics
2009